Orbit Group is a group of housing associations providing affordable housing to around 40,000 households in England, mainly in the Midlands, East Anglia and the south east, operating out of 7 offices with the head office in Coventry.

History

Orbit Housing Association was established in 1966.  In 1998 the company established Orbit Bexley Housing Association to take on the management of the 4,500 transferred from the London Borough of Bexley, under a process known as large scale voluntary transfer (LSVT). Thanet Community Housing Association joined the group in 2004 and brought with it stock in east Kent. In October 2007 Orbit Bexley and Thanet Community were merged to form Orbit South.

Orbit is active in promoting shared ownership as well as providing homes for rent. In 2010, Orbit helped 117 families through the Government's 'Mortgage Rescue' scheme, more than any other association.

In 2009 Orbit Homes, the development and sales arm of the Orbit Group was formed. Orbit Homes build in excess of 1,000 new homes per year across a range of tenures including Shared Ownership, Outright Sale and Independent Living throughout the Midlands, East and South East of England 

In 2012, Baroness Tessa Blackstone joined the board of the Orbit Group as its future Chair.

Orbit Group appointed Phil Andrew, the current CEO of StepChange, as its new CEO starting July 2023. He will take over from Mark Hoyland, who has served as Orbit Group CEO since 2017.

References

External links
Official Site

Housing associations based in England
1966 establishments in the United Kingdom